Offignies is a commune in the Somme department in Hauts-de-France in northern France.

Geography

Population

History
In 1972. Offignies absorbed the neighbouring commune of Orival.
The church at Orival was destroyed during the Second World War, in 1940 and rebuilt in 1954
At Orival, traces of an 18th-century château and outbuildings may be seen. There are also outlines of  Gallo-Roman farms and an old windmill.

See also
Communes of the Somme department

References

Communes of Somme (department)